Goldenrod, also retitled Glory Days in some releases, is a Canadian drama film directed by Harvey Hart and released in 1976. Based on the novel by Herbert Harker, the film stars Tony Lo Bianco as Jesse Gifford, a former rodeo champion who must take responsibility for raising his two sons as a single parent after his wife Shirley (Gloria Carlin) leaves him.

The film's cast also includes Patricia Hamilton, Ed McNamara, Donald Pleasence and Donnelly Rhodes.

The film had a brief theatrical run in Toronto in 1976, but was withdrawn from theatres after the filmmakers secured a deal with CBS, which aired it as a television film in 1977. Hart won the Canadian Film Award for Best Director in 1976.

References

External links 
 

1976 films
Canadian drama television films
English-language Canadian films
Films shot in Alberta
Films set in Alberta
Films directed by Harvey Hart
1970s English-language films
1970s Canadian films